The National Defence Academy of Latvia is a defence academy of higher education and scientific research in Riga, Latvia. It was established on 13 February 1992 as the Academy of the Ministry of Defense of the Republic of Latvia. It builds on the historic traditions of the pre-WWII Latvian School of War (Latvijas Kara skola). It is the only military academy in Latvia. The Latvian Armed Forces also contribute to and utilize the Baltic Defence College in Tartu.

Programmes
Programmes are divided as follows:
 Professional bachelor's degree
Land Force Military Leadership
Naval Force Military Leadership
Air Force Military Leadership
 Professional higher education study
Commanding officer training
 Professional master's study programme
Professional master's degree in military leadership and security

Rectors
The Following have served as academy rectors:
 Col. Valdis Matīss (30/03/1992 - 27/02/1998)
 Lt. Col. Ilmārs Vīksne (27/02/1998 - 03/04/2001)
 Lt. Col. Juris Maklakovs (03/04/2001 - 13/05/2004)
 Brig.-Gen. Kārlis Krēsliņš (14/05/2004 - 27/05/2005)
 Lt. Col. Gunārs Upītis (28/05/2005 - 28/09/2007)
 Capt. Vladimirs Dreimanis (28/09/2007 - 30/06/2010)
 Col. Andris Kalniņš (30/06/2010 - 10/05/2011)
 Col. Egils Leščinskis (10/05/2011 - 19/06/2015)
 Lt. Col. Georgs Kerlins (19/06/2015 - 29/08/2017)
Col. Valts Āboliņš (29/08/2017 - 14/07/2020)
Col. Oskars Kudlis (since 14/07/2020)

References

External links 
 Official website

Education in Riga
Universities and colleges in Latvia
1992 establishments in Latvia
Educational institutions established in 1992
Military of Latvia
Military academies